The Opium of Talibans is a 2001 French documentary film and road movie written and directed by Olivier Weber and François Margolin, dealing with the effects of the talibans rule in Afghanistan. It premiered at the 2001 FIPA Festival, and received the Special Prize at the 14th edition of the Festival.

Overview
Through interviews with locals, militants, taliban commanders, the film discusses the effects of the introduction of the fundamentalism in Afghanistan. The film also dwells at length, and sometimes with humor, on hypocrisy of this regime, dealing with drugs, opium and heroin. As Mollah Akhunzada, member of the taliban government, says in the film: the talibans send drugs and poisons to other peoples of the planet and non-Muslims. The film shows also the threat on the Buddhas of Bamiyan, threatened by talibans and Al Qaida militants and then destroyed.

Awards
 2001 The International Festival of Audiovisual Programmes (Festival International de Programmes Audiovisuels in French) FIPA Special Film Award
 2001 Award Premis Actual 2001 of the Catalan Broadcasting Corporation (CCRTV, Spain)

References

External links
 Festival International de Programmes Audiovisuels
 The Opium of the talibans on Cinéfil
 The Opium of the talibans on Lussasdoc.org

2001 films
2001 documentary films
French documentary films
Documentary films about the War in Afghanistan (2001–2021)
2000s French films